Paul Vinitsky (born Vinitsky Pavel; June 11, 1983 in Dubna, Moscow Region, Russia) is a Russian electronic dance music trance and progressive DJ & producer.

Vinitsky released in autumn 2011 his debut album with 9 vocalists and own unique option, the DJ singing his own tracks on stage.

Biography
Vinitsky is from the capital of Russian Federation, Moscow.

Vinitsky is the unique artist of new progressive trance wave. He's the well known worldwide Russian DJ, producer & singer in progressive house, trance & tech trance scene. He's founder and A&R of the Moscow-based label 'Vendace Records', the best imprint from Russia. Just in several years he becomes one of the most known EDM artists in Russia. 4 years in a row he ranked in top100 Russian DJs. In 2012 Paul got his highest line in the most important global DJ MAG poll with #278, one of only 8 Russian EDM artists which are entered top 300.

Vinitsky has the high touring activity. He already performed more than 250 gigs in more than 50 cities in Russia, Indonesia, Ukraine, Poland, Czech Republic, Syria & Kazakhstan. He's a storming DJ and he's crazy when he's playing on the decks. People are saying that he's really 'playing' with every sound, with every movement of every part of his body. It is really how the DJ has to work with the crowd. He'd already played warmup sets for the biggest artists like Marco V, Sander van Doorn, ATB and on one scene with Markus Schulz, Kosheen and many others.

Being very productive artist in last 2 years Vinitsky released dozen of singles, pack of remixes, mixed album and debut artist album Invincible. Many worldwide EDM known singers cooperated with Vinitsky and were featured on the album, such as Lo-Fi Sugar from US, #1 charted Kate Walsh from UK, another British house star Lizzie Curious, such singers as Khashassi, Meital de Razon and other talented artists. For the slamming debut Vinitsky composed, produced and arranged fully himself 14 tracks. Moreover, his unique 'Singing Dj' project and live show were featured on the album, where Vinitsky sings on studio and then performs live his own tracks on the stage. Also Vinitsky made a banging remix for Depeche Mode which was voted #1 in the Beatport contest, produced the remixes for many labels, including Black Hole Records, Dancepush, and such artists as Andy Duguid, Julie Thompson, Virtual Vault, Flash Brothers and more.

In April 2013 the second artist album Re*Invincible of Vinitsky is coming out with the totally outstanding polished sound and great collaborations with the vocalists Elizabeth Fields from UK, Jane Maximova from Russia, Fisher from US. Vinitsky's vocal production is made together with Andrew StetS from Ukraine. Various remixes in trance and progressive house sounds are featured on the album including smashing ones from Adam Kancerski, Arisen Flame, Dejan S., Jay P (more known as house star Reflekt) and more.

His tracks and remixes were included in many important compilations and tracklisted by huge number of DJs, including such DJs as Armin van Buuren, Paul Oakenfold, Marco V, Matt Darey, Andy Moor, Aly & Fila, Flash Brothers, Sean Tyas, Richard Durand, Marcus Schossow, Ronski Speed, Dj Feel, Sied van Riel and Solar Stone.

Vinitsky is a host of biweekly radioshow 'Trance Dance Show aka #TDS'. It is very important on the EDM scene and has dozens of thousands of listeners and podcast subscribers. It is broadcast on more than fifteen FM & internet stations in all continents. More than 25,000 people download the show episodes using #TDS podcast.

Vinitsky is the owner of the record label, Vendace Records, which is supported by all big artists like Armin van Buuren, Paul Oakenfold, Above & Beyond and others. Some DJs call the label one of their favorites (Armin van Buuren, Solarstone, Jorn van Deynhoven). Vinitsky opens new talents globally on it. In 3 years of existence Vendace Records released almost 80 singles, EP's and albums.

Discography

Singles

Remixes

Artist albums

Mixed albums

External links

Trance Dance Show website
Paul Vinitsky Facebook Page
Paul Vinitsky in Twitter
Paul Vinitsky in Soundcloud
Paul Vinitsky in YouTube
Paul Vinitsky at LiveJournal
The DJ List: Paul Vinitsky

1983 births
Living people
Russian DJs